In England and Wales, charter trustees are set up to maintain the continuity of a town charter or city charter after a district with the status of a borough or city has been abolished, until such time as a parish council is established.  Duties are limited to ceremonial activities such as the election of a mayor, and various other functions depending upon local customs and laws.

The charter trustees are made up of local councillors in the district representing wards within the boundaries of the town/city. If there are fewer than three district councillors for the former borough, then qualified local electors may be co-opted to make the number up to three.

Charter trustees must hold an annual meeting within twenty-one days of the annual meeting of the district council. The first item of business is the election of a town or city mayor and deputy mayor for the next year. The charter trustees of Lowestoft failed to nominate any candidate for the office of town mayor for several years until a change of political control in 2003, the trustees being effectively in abeyance. 

Since 2021 there have been sixteen towns in England which continue to appoint charter trustees.

History

Local Government Act 1972

The original bodies of charter trustees were set up in 1974, under section 246 of the Local Government Act 1972. The concept was introduced into the Bill by a government amendment in September 1972.

Section 245(4) of the Local Government Act 1972 allowed the 'shadow' district councils to make a petition to the Queen for borough status, before their coming into effect on 1 April 1974.  In this case, if "it is signified on behalf of Her Majesty before that date that She proposes to accede" to the request then, the style of borough could be used immediately from 1 April 1974, despite the fact that the charter would be presented only later.

For the new districts which made no such petition (or where it was refused), for each former municipal borough in the district which was to become an unparished area rather than a successor parish, a body corporate styled the charter trustees of the town or city, were established, under section 246(4) of the Act.

In the original legislation, charter trustees could also be formed in Welsh districts, but the Charter Trustees Order 1974, which provided for the establishment of the trustees, stated that the section "shall not apply to the area consisting of the counties established by section 20 of the Act (new local government areas in Wales)", and  "there will be no charter trustees in Wales."

Charter Trustees Act 1985

Originally, under section 246(7), when the district in which a town for which charter trustees had been established gained the status of a borough, the trustees would be immediately dissolved. Some new district councils petitioned for borough status soon after 1 April 1974, quickly dissolving the charter trustees.

This was changed by the Charter Trustees Act 1985, which provided that charter trustees would cease to exist only when a parish council was formed for the area of the former borough.

Local Government Act 1992

Legislation passed in 1992 led to the establishment of Local Government Commission whose remit was to review the system created in 1974. As a result there was a partial reorganisation, with a number of districts with borough or city status being abolished. The mechanism of creating charter trustees to preserve civic traditions was again used. However, trustees were created only where an outgoing council requested their establishment. The failure of the extinguished City of Rochester-upon-Medway council to appoint charter trustees for Rochester or to apply for Rochester's city status to be transferred to the replacement unitary authority of Medway led to Rochester losing its city status.

Some abolished boroughs such as Beverley included a large rural area. In such cases, the charter trustees were not established for the entire area of the former borough, but were limited to that part of the new authority which was unparished: the area identifiable as the town.

Local Government and Public Involvement in Health Act 2007

A further wave of reorganisations came into effect in some areas of England on 1 April 2009, under the terms of the Local Government and Public Involvement in Health Act 2007. The reforms saw the creation of new unitary authorities and the abolition of a number of districts with city or borough status. The Charter Trustees Regulations 2009 allow for the creation of trustees to preserve civic traditions in those areas where there is no obvious successor parish council. In the case of the cities of Chester and Durham the charter trustees area are identical to the entire abolished district, which includes not only the central unparished area but also the surrounding parishes.

List

Changes in April 2009

The structural changes to local government in 2009 affected charter trustees. Trustees were formed in a number of new unitary authorities to preserve the mayoralty and civic traditions of abolished boroughs. At the same time, the charter trustees of Salisbury were dissolved on the parishing of the area.

Changes in 2019
Charter trustees were established in April 2019 for Bournemouth, Poole and Taunton as a consequence of local government structural changes in Dorset and Somerset.

Changes in 2023
On 1 April 2023 unitary authorities will be created in Cumbria and North Yorkshire. Elections to the councils were held in May 2022 and they are acting as 'shadow' councils until 2023. It has been announced that charter trustees will be established for Carlisle (which will also preserve its city status  The North Yorkshire (Structural Changes) Order 2022 establishes trustees for Harrogate and Scarborough.

References

External links
An article about Charter Trustees from the City of Bath

Sources
Local Government Act 1972
Charter Trustees Act 1985 (C.45)
Local Government in England and Wales : A guide to the New System, HMSO, London 1974

Local government in the United Kingdom